The Committee on the Future Relationship with the European Union, commonly known as the Brexit Select Committee and formerly the Exiting the European Union Select Committee, was a select committee of the British House of Commons that examines matters relating to the United Kingdom's relationship with the European Union after Brexit. Until the department's closure on 31 January 2020, the committee scrutinised the work of the Department for Exiting the European Union, which had been launched by Prime Minister Theresa May in July 2016 following the 'Leave' vote in the UK's referendum on membership of the European Union. It was dissolved on 16 January 2021 in line with the temporary standing order which formed the committee.

History 
In November 2017 Parliament voted that a humble address be made to the monarch to direct the government to release its impact assessments regarding the effects of Brexit on the national economy.

The motion, put forward by the opposition, requested:

That an humble Address be presented to Her Majesty, That she will be graciously pleased to give directions that the list of sectors analysed under the instruction of Her Majesty's Ministers, and referred to in the Answer of 26 June 2017 to Question 239, be laid before this House and that the impact assessments arising from those analyses be provided to the Committee on Exiting the European Union.

Following Exit Day on 31 January 2020 and the closure of the Department for Exiting the European Union, on 2 March the Exiting the European Union Committee was renamed the Committee on the Future Relationship with the European Union and its responsibilities altered to focus on the UK's relations with the EU after Brexit.

The committee was dissolved on 16 January 2021 as the temporary standing order lapsed. Chairmen Hilary Benn wrote to Leader of the House of Commons Jacob Rees-Mogg to extend the committee's lifespan in order to evaluate the impact of the EU–UK Trade and Cooperation Agreement on the UK. This request was denied, with Rees-Mogg saying other select committees could perform this function.

Membership 
On 19 October 2016, Hilary Benn was elected as the first chairman of the committee. Labour MPs voted for their remaining four representatives from a shortlist on 25 October. The Conservatives selected their representatives on 26 October. The remaining members were published in the House of Commons Order Paper for 27 October, except the SDLP's choice. After the 2017 general election another committee election was held Hilary Benn being re-elected as chair and members announced on 8 September 2017 due to be approved by the House of Commons on 11 September 2017. Of the committee 13 backed the remain campaign and 7 backed the leave campaign.

Hilary Benn was again re-elected chairman of the committee on 30 January 2020. With the renaming of the committee on 2 March, a new slate of members was agreed for the Parliament that had begun in December 2019, consisting of 12 Conservative, 7 Labour, and two SNP members.

Membership 2016–17
The chair was elected on 19 October 2016, with members being announced on 31 October 2016.

Changes 2016-2017

Membership 2017–19
The chair was elected on 12 July 2017, with the members of the committee being announced on 11 September 2017.

Membership 2019–2021

Committee breakdown

References

External links 
 Official Website

Select Committees of the British House of Commons
2016 establishments in the United Kingdom
Brexit
Brexit withdrawal agreement
2021 disestablishments in the United Kingdom